The Clef Club was an entertainment venue and society for African-American musicians in Harlem, achieving its largest success in the 1910s. Incorporated by James Reese Europe in 1910, it was a combination musicians' hangout, fraternity club, labor exchange, and concert hall, across the street from Marshall's Hotel. In its best years, the Clef Club's annual take exceeded $100,000.

For musical entertainment in the club, Europe created the first all African-American orchestra in the country called the Clef Club Orchestra. This orchestra was very large, numbering around 125 members, and consisted of a wide variety of instruments. Among the instruments included the normal orchestral instruments of violins, violas, cellos, basses, and the normal wind and brass instruments, but also included mandolins, guitars, banjos, ukuleles, and a large bass drum. These “strummed” instruments were not in small amounts either. According to one account the orchestra included “thirty strummers- ten each of mandolins, guitars and a rare harp guitar, and banjos.” The orchestra was also frequently joined by a men's chorus, eight pianists, and various soloists.

Very few of these musicians had any musical training, and hardly any could read music. The conductor is quoted as saying: “I always put a man who can read notes in the middle where the others can pick him up."

The Clef Club orchestra performed in 1912 - 1915 on the stage of Carnegie Hall in New York City. This concert stands as a crowning achievement for both the orchestra as well as Europe. The orchestra was very well received, and it is said that during one concert march in particular “music-loving Manhattan felt a thrill down its spine such as only the greatest performances can inspire.” 

Among Reese's musical collaborators at the Clef Club was Ford Dabney, composer of the song "Shine".

References

Music venues in Manhattan
1910 establishments in New York City
Harlem